Stictoleptura rubra, the Red-brown Longhorn Beetle, is a species of beetles belonging to the family Cerambycidae.

Subspecies
Three subspecies are known besides the nominate subspecies (S. rubra rubra):
 Stictoleptura rubra dichroa (Blanchard, 1871)
 Stictoleptura rubra numidica (Peyerhimoff, 1917)
 Stictoleptura rubra succedanea (Lewis, 1873)

Description
This species has an evident sexual dimorphism, with variations in color and shape. Elytrae and pronotum of the females are uniformly reddish-brown or reddish-orange, while in males head and pronotum are black. Moreover the males have brown or pale ochre elytrae and often they are smaller and narrower than the females.

Biology
Life cycle of this species lasts two - three years. Adults can be encountered from May to September, but mainly in July and August). They visit flowering plants for nectar and/or pollen, while larvae develop and feed within dead wood and tree stumps of coniferous trees (Picea, Pinus, Abies, Larix). To develop and reach maturity they need nutrients provided by fungi. Theirs gut contains cellulase-producing yeasts to enable xylophagy, or wood-digestion.

Distribution
The species is found throughout the European mainland, Russia and North Africa. It can also be found in Turkey and Great Britain.

Gallery

References

Stictoleptura
Beetles described in 1758
Taxa named by Carl Linnaeus
Beetles of Asia
Beetles of Europe
Articles containing video clips